Planina pri Cerknem is a village in the hills east of Cerkno in the traditional Littoral region of Slovenia.

Name
The name of the settlement was changed from Planina to Planina pri Cerknem in 1955.

Church
The local church is dedicated to John the Baptist and belongs to the Parish of Cerkno.

Other cultural heritage
On the road to Čeplez there is a Partisan monument consisting of two pieces of concrete linked by four wooden beams. The concrete element to the left bears a plaque with the names of the fallen and a dedication. The monument was designed by J. Bizjak and was unveiled on 6 May 1973.

References

External links

Planina pri Cerknem on Geopedia

Populated places in the Municipality of Cerkno